Six Days of the Condor is a thriller novel by American author James Grady, first published in 1974 by W.W. Norton. The story is a suspense drama set in then-contemporary Washington, D.C., and is considerably different from the 1975 film version, Three Days of the Condor. It was followed by a second novel by Grady titled  Shadow of the Condor, released in 1978.  Two more sequels, Next Day of the Condor and Last Days of the Condor came out in 2015.

Plot
Ronald Malcolm is a CIA employee who works in a clandestine operations office in Washington, D.C. responsible for analyzing the plots of mystery and spy novels. One day, when he should be in the office, Malcolm slips out a basement entrance for lunch. In his absence a group of armed men gain entrance to the office and kill everyone there. Malcolm returns, realizes he is in grave danger, and telephones a phone number at CIA headquarters he has been given for emergencies.

When he phones in (and remembers to give his code name "Condor"), he is told to meet an agent named Weatherby who will "bring him in" for protection. However, Weatherby is part of a rogue group within the CIA, the same group responsible for the original assassinations. Weatherby tries to kill Malcolm, who manages to escape. On the run, Malcolm uses his wits to elude both the rogue CIA group and the proper CIA authorities, both of which have a vested interest in his capture or death.

Seeking shelter, Malcolm kidnaps a paralegal named Wendy Ross whom he overhears saying she will spend her coming vacation days holed up in her apartment. Knowing no one will notice her absence, Malcolm enlists her aid in finding out more about the forces after him. She is shot and seriously wounded in the process, but survives.

It is then revealed that the rogue group was using the section where Malcolm works to import illegal drugs from Laos. A supervisor stumbled onto a discrepancy in the records exposing this operation, thus necessitating the section's elimination.

Adaptations
In 1975, Sydney Pollack directed the film Three Days of the Condor, adapted by David Rayfiel and Lorenzo Semple from Grady's novel.
In 2014, Grady wrote a sequel titled Last Days of the Condor that has been optioned for film by MGM.
In 2018, AT&T Audience aired a 10-episode television series Condor, adapted from a blend of the novel and the film, produced by MGM Television and Skydance TV. Max Irons plays the role of Condor/Joe Turner.

References

1974 American novels
American novels adapted into films
American thriller novels
Fiction books about the Central Intelligence Agency
Novels by James Grady
Novels set in Washington, D.C.
W. W. Norton & Company books